Hockey at the 1936 Olympics may refer to:

Ice hockey at the 1936 Winter Olympics
Field hockey at the 1936 Summer Olympics